Demons is an album by the Swedish stoner rock band Spiritual Beggars.
It was first released in Japan on 23 March 2005 as a deluxe 2 two cd digipak which includes a bonus live CD with material recorded at the Shibuya Ax in Tokyo, Japan on 18 April 2003. Released shortly after the 2 disc version sold out was a single disc jewel case version with same artwork as the digipak.

Demons was finally released in Europe on 20 June 2005. Also in two versions – a single CD version with the original artwork and the two CD version but with different artwork.

Track listing
All music by Michael Amott, all lyrics by Michael Amott except "No One Heard" by Janne "JB" Christoffersson, and "Not Fragile" by C. Fred Turner.

Disc one:
 Inner Strength (Intro) - 1:19
 Throwing Your Life Away - 3:32
 Salt in Your Wounds - 3:19
 One Man Army - 3:57
 Through the Halls - 5:08
 Treading Water - 3:33
 Dying Every Day - 5:45
 Born to Die - 4:34
 Born to Die (Reprise) - 1:21
 In My Blood - 4:13
 Elusive - 3:33
 Sleeping with One Eye Open - 3:44
 No One Heard - 5:02
Total length - 49:20

Disc two (Live in Japan):
 Monster Astronauts - 3:55
 Angel of Betrayal - 4:14
 Young Man, Old Soul - 3:21
 Wonderful World - 4:21
 Blind Mountain - 4:17
 Guitar Solo - 2:04
 Look Back - 5:14
 Not Fragile (Jam) - 4:07
Total length - 31:33

2005 albums
Spiritual Beggars albums